The Viscounty of Besalú, or Bas (from the Latin Basso), was the sub-comital authority in the county of Besalú during the Middle Ages. It was ruled by the House of Cervera (also called Cerveró(n) or Cervelló(n), from the Latin Cervaria).

Bernard I, circa 986 
Huguet, circa 1000 
Udalard I, 1079–1115 
Udalard II, 1115–1123 
Peter I, 1123–1127 
Beatrice, 1127–1142 
Ponce I Hugh, 1127–1130, husband 
Peter II, c. 1130–1140 (associat 1130–1140) 
Ponce II, 1140–1155 (associat 1140–1142) 
Hugh I, 1155–1185 
Ponce III, regent 1185–1195 
Peter III, regent 1195–1198 
Hugh II, 1198 (nominally 1185–1221) 
Hugh III, regent 1198–1220 
Peter IV, 1221–1241 
Eldiarda, regent 1220–1231 
Simon, 1231–1247 (until 1241 as regent) 
Sibylla, 1247–1280 
Hugh IV, 1262–1277, husband
Peter V, 1280–1285, also King of Aragon
Ponce IV, 1285–1291 
Hugh V, 1291–1300 
confiscated by the crown, 1300–1315
Ponce V, 1315–1322 
Raymond, 1322–1331 
briefly to the crown, 1331
Hugh VI, 1331–1335 
Bernard II, 1335–1354 
contested by the crown, 1335–1352 
Bernard III, 1354–1368 
to the crown, 1368–1381 
to the Cabrera, 1381–1756

 
Medieval Catalonia